The American Martial Arts Alliance is a non-for profit foundation which is responsible for creating the AMAA Who's Who in the Martial Arts Hall of Fame which is held once a year. Jessie Bowen Executive Director of the foundation has published books about the inductees of the award and has dedicated two volumes of the publication to Chuck Norris for a life time of achievements.

AMAA Foundation publications
To focus on the importance of martial arts Bowen through The American Martial Arts Foundation published a book titled Martial Arts Master & Pioneers. In its 380 pages the book tells the stories of 200 martial artists from every corner of the world whom have contribute to their community.

The 2017 edition of Who's Who in the Martial Arts, autobiography focusing on the over 200 martial artists viewed as legends in the art and tournament sport, spanning the last 60 years.

Bowen believes it is an awareness tool for parents and students to understand what the martial arts are about but more importantly to know the instructors that can properly help them improve the quality of their lives or their kids. It serves to educate them in self defense and find who's qualified to teach children.

Several other publications revolving around high achievers in martial arts have also been published by Bowen through the AMAA.

Bibliography
 WHO'S WHO In The Martial Arts: Directory & Biographies (2015 Volume 1).
 Who's Who in the Martial Arts (2016 Volume 2).
 Who's Who in the Martial Arts: Legends Edition (2017 Volume 3).
 Martial Arts Masters & Pioneers: Who's Really Who in the Martial Arts (2018 Volume 4).
 Action Martial Arts Magazine Hall of Honors: Official Who Who's Directory Book''' (2019 Volume 1).
 Martial Arts Masters & Pioneers Biography: Chuck Norris - Giving Back For A Lifetime (2020 Volume 1).
 Martial Arts Masters & Pioneers Biography: Chuck Norris - Giving Back For A Lifetime'' (2020 Volume 2).

References

External links
 

Awards established in 2016
Halls of fame in Nevada
Sports halls of fame